Mary Mackay may refer to:
 Mary Mackay (1855–1924), English novelist, known by her pseudonym Marie Corelli
 Mary Mackay (actor), Irish-Australian actress